James Keith (September 7, 1839 – January 2, 1918) was a Virginia lawyer, soldier, politician and judge, who served as the chief judge of the Supreme Court of Virginia (then called the Supreme Court of Appeals) from 1895 to 1916.

Early and family life
Born in Fauquier County, Virginia in 1839 to Circuit Judge Isham Keith (1798–1863) and his wife, the former Juliette Chilton, James Keith received his early education in local schools and studied law under Professor John B. Minor at the University of Virginia. His grandfather, Thomas Keith, fought in the American Revolutionary War. His father also owned a woolen mill at Waterloo. In 1860, Isham Keith owned 17 enslaved people, and his son James also may have owned at least one slave.

In 1873, Keith married  Lilias Gordon Morson (1848–1877) in Fauquier County. She was the daughter of Arthur Alexander Morson of Richmond and his Fauquier-born wife, Maria Scott. Ten years after her death, in 1887 the widower married her younger sister, Frances Backsdale Morson (1855–1908), who had a daughter and a son: Juliet Chilton Crockett (1888–1967) and Arthur Alexander Morson Keith (1891–1979).

American Civil War

During the American Civil War, James Keith and his slightly older brother Isham Keith Jr. (1833–1902) enlisted as privates in the Black Horse Cavalry and served for the duration. James Keith was promoted to adjutant on December 7, 1863. After surrendering at Appomattox Court House, he was paroled at Winchester on May 30, 1865, and received a presidential pardon on August 19, 1865.

Postwar

After the war, James Keith resumed his law studies under John M. Forbes, a prominent lawyer in Warrenton. Fauquier County voters elected Keith to the Virginia House of Delegates in 1869 and he served in the session of 1869—70. In late 1870, he was elected as judge of the Eleventh Judicial Circuit, composed of Alexandria, Fauquier, Fairfax, Loudoun, Prince William and Rappahannock counties.

Keith established an outstanding record as a circuit judge until January 1, 1895, when legislators elected him to the Supreme Court of Appeals, and his fellow judges elected him their president (chief judge) soon afterwards. He continued as a judge and president until he retired on June 10, 1916.

He was active in the United Confederate Veterans and presented a portrait of Fauquier County's General (and later U.S. Congressman and Senator Eppa Hunton to the Richmond chapter.

Death and legacy

Keith, who suffered from a heart condition, died of pneumonia just after New Year's day, 1918. He was buried at Richmond's Hollywood Cemetery beside his wives. The Library of Virginia maintains his official papers. The Virginia Historical Society has some Keith family papers, maintained by Fanny Scott, the wife of Virginia Attorney General Robert Taylor Scott, and who led the Black Horse Chapter of the United Daughters of the Confederacy at Warrenton (the unit which had both sons of Judge Isham, and where that Judge Keith died and was buried).

References

External links

Justices of the Supreme Court of Virginia
Virginia lawyers
1839 births
1918 deaths
People of Virginia in the American Civil War
People from Fauquier County, Virginia
19th-century American judges
19th-century American lawyers
Virginia circuit court judges